DRM may refer to:

Government, military and politics
 Defense reform movement, U.S. campaign inspired by Col. John Boyd
 Democratic Republic of Madagascar, a former socialist state (1975–1992) on Madagascar
 Direction du renseignement militaire, the French Directorate of Military Intelligence
 Disability rights movement
 Disaster risk management

Science and technology

Information technology
 Digital rights management, access control technologies that limit the usage of digital content and devices
 "Digital restrictions management", a re-purposing of the acronym by the Defective by Design movement
 Data Reference Model, one of the five reference models of the Federal Enterprise Architecture
 Digital Radio Mondiale, a set of digital audio broadcasting technologies
 Direct Rendering Manager, a component of Linux's Direct Rendering Infrastructure
 Distributed resource manager or job scheduler, a software application that is in charge of unattended background executions

Biology and psychology
 Deese–Roediger–McDermott paradigm, a paradigm in cognitive psychology for investigating false memories
 Desmin related myopathy, a subgroup of the myofibrillar myopathy diseases
 Detergent resistant membrane, a lipid raft
 Digestive rate model, the diet selection that animals should perform to maximize energy or nutrients
 Gremlin (protein) or Drm, an inhibitor in the TGF beta signaling pathway

Other uses in science and technology
 Detrital remanent magnetization, the residual magnetization in sediments
 Diamond and Related Materials, a journal in materials science

Sports
 Deutsche Rallye Meisterschaft, a German motor rally series
 Deutsche Rennsport Meisterschaft, a 1970s German auto racing series

Other uses
 Danbury Railway Museum, Connecticut, US
 DRM (Japanese band), a J-pop girl group
 Dispute resolution mechanism, an acronym applicable to dispute resolution (e.g., in diplomatic or contractual matters)
 Di Ravello Militia, the main antagonist faction in Just Cause 3